Ozerna is a neighbourhood in northeast Edmonton, Alberta, Canada. Subdivision and development of the neighbourhood is guided by the Ozerna Neighbourhood Structure Plan (NSP).

It is located within Edmonton's Lake District and was originally considered Neighbourhood 6 within the Edmonton North Area Structure Plan (ASP).

Ozerna is bounded by the Mayliewan neighbourhood to the west, the Schonsee neighbourhood across 167 Avenue to the north, the Matt Berry neighbourhood across 66 Street to the east, and the Kilkenny neighbourhood across 153 Avenue to the south.

As with all neighbourhoods located within the Lake District, which are named after a body of water or a term for water in a language other than English, Ozerna is a Ukrainian word that means “lake area.”

Demographics 

Housing 
In 2005, Ozerna's housing breakdown consisted of 78% single-family dwellings, 12% duplexes, 10% low-rise apartments (fewer than five storeys), and 1% row houses.
I

Surrounding neighbourhoods

References

External links 
 Ozerna Neighbourhood Profile

Neighbourhoods in Edmonton